Mental health law includes a wide variety of legal topics and pertain to people with a diagnosis or possible diagnosis of a mental health condition, and to those involved in managing or treating such people. Laws that relate to mental health include:

employment laws, including laws that prohibit employment discrimination on the basis of a mental health condition, require reasonable accommodations in the workplace, and provide mental health-related leave;
insurance laws, including laws governing mental health coverage by medical insurance plans, disability insurance, workers compensation, and Social Security Disability Insurance;
housing laws, including housing discrimination and zoning;
education laws, including laws that prohibit discrimination, and laws that require reasonable accommodations, equal access to programs and services, and free appropriate public education;
laws that provide a right to treatment; 
involuntary commitment and guardianship laws; 
laws governing treatment professionals, including licensing laws, confidentiality, informed consent, and medical malpractice;  
laws governing admission of expert testimony or other psychiatric evidence in court; and
criminal laws, including laws governing fitness for trial or execution, and the insanity defense.
  
Mental health law has received relatively little attention in scholarly legal forums. The University of Memphis Cecil C. Humphreys School of Law in 2011 announced the formation of a student-edited law journal entitled "Mental Health Law & Policy Journal."

United States

Employment
Title I of the Americans with Disabilities Act of 1990 ("ADA") is a civil rights law that protects individuals with depression, posttraumatic stress disorder ("PTSD"), and other mental health conditions in the workplace. It prohibits employers with 15 or more employees from firing, refusing to hire, or taking other adverse actions against a job applicant or employee based on real or perceived mental health conditions. It also strictly limits the circumstances under which an employer can ask for information about medical conditions, including mental health conditions, and imposes confidentiality requirements on any medical information that the employer does have.

The ADA also requires employers to provide reasonable accommodations to job applicants or employees with mental health conditions under some circumstances. A reasonable accommodation is a special arrangement or piece of equipment that a person needs because of a medical condition to apply for a job, do a job, or enjoy the benefits and privileges of employment. Examples include a flexible schedule, changes in the method of supervision, and permission to work from home. To have the right to a reasonable accommodation, the worker's mental health condition must meet the ADA's definition of a "current disability." Conditions that should easily qualify include major depression, PTSD, bipolar disorder, obsessive-compulsive disorder ("OCD"), and schizophrenia. Other conditions may also qualify, depending on what the symptoms would be if the condition were left untreated, during an active episode (if the condition involves active episodes). The symptoms do not need to be severe or permanent for the condition to be a disability under the ADA.

Under the Family and Medical Leave Act of 1993 (FMLA), certain employees are entitled to up to twelve weeks of job-protected and unpaid leave to recover from a serious illness or to care for a family member with a serious illness, among other reasons. To be eligible, the employer must have had 50 or more employees in 20 or more workweeks in the current or preceding calendar year, or else must be a public agency, elementary school, or secondary school, and the employee must have worked for the employer for at least
12 months, must have at least 1,250 hours of service for the employer during the 12-month period immediately preceding the leave, and must work at a location where the employer has at least 50 employees within 75 miles.

United Kingdom 
Various pieces of legislation including Mental Health Act 1983 and the Mental Capacity Act 2005 govern mental health law giving mental health professionals the ability to commit individuals, treat them without consent and place restrictions on them while in public through outpatient commitment, according to the rules of this legislation. These decisions can be challenged through the mental health tribunals which contain members of the judiciary, though the initial decisions are made by mental health professionals alone.

Around the world

Civil commitment
Mental health legislation is largely used in the management of psychiatric disorders, such as dementia or psychosis, and developmental disabilities where a person does not possess the ability to act in a legally competent manner and requires treatment and/or another person to act in his or her best interests. The laws generally cover the requirements and procedures for involuntary commitment and compulsory treatment in a psychiatric hospital or other facility.

In some jurisdictions, court orders are required for compulsory treatment; in others, psychiatrists may treat compulsorily by following set procedures, usually with means of appeal or regular scrutiny to ensure compliance with the law such as through mental health tribunals.

Sources of law
Mental health law includes areas of both civil and criminal common and statutory law.

Common law is based on long-standing English legal principles, as interpreted through case law. Mental health-related legal concepts include mens rea, insanity defences; legal definitions of "sane," "insane," and "incompetent;" informed consent; and automatism, amongst many others.

Statutory law usually takes the form of a mental health statute. An example is the Mental Health Act 1983 in England and Wales. These acts codify aspects of the treatment of mental illness and provides rules and procedures to be followed and penalties for breaches.

Not all countries have mental health acts. The World Health Report (2001) lists the following percentages, by region, for countries with and without mental health legislation.

See also
Basaglia Law
Bazelon Center for Mental Health Law
Mental Capacity Act 2005
Mental Disability Advocacy Center
Mental Health (Care and Treatment) (Scotland) Act 2003
Psychiatric advance directive
Mentally ill people in United States jails and prisons#Legal aspects

Notes
Presence of mental health policies and legislation, The World Health Report 2001, chap. 4, fig. 4.1 (accessed June 8, 2005).

Further reading 
Atkinson, J. (2006), Private and Public Protection: Civil Mental Health Legislation, Edinburgh, Dunedin Academic Press
Whelan, D. (2009), Mental Health Law and Practice: Civil and Criminal Aspects, Dublin, Round Hall

References

 
United States federal civil rights legislation
Disability legislation
Anti-discrimination law in the United States